Keith Kim Anderson (born May 12, 1955) is a retired American basketball coach and most recently was head coach for the Pittsburg State Gorillas.

Career
Anderson previously served as the men's basketball head coach of the Missouri Tigers. He led the Central Missouri Mules to back-to-back MIAA championships and three appearances in the NCAA Division II Final Four in 2007, 2009 and winning the championship in 2014. He led the Mules to the NCAA Men's Division II Basketball Championship in 2014 by defeating West Liberty 84–77. He played collegiately for the University of Missouri.

Born in Sedalia, Missouri, he was selected by the Portland Trail Blazers in the 2nd round (28th pick overall) of the 1977 NBA Draft and by the Milwaukee Bucks in the 7th round (146th pick overall) of the 1978 NBA Draft.

He played for the Trail Blazers (1978–79) in the NBA for 21 games.

He also was a court coach for Team USA during the Pan American Games Team Trials.

On April 28, 2014 it was announced that he would take over the job vacated by Frank Haith at the University of Missouri, his alma mater.

After three seasons of finishing in last place in the Southeastern Conference, Missouri asked him to step down on March 5, 2017.

On March 24, 2017, Anderson was announced as the Pittsburg State men's basketball coach, returning to the MIAA.

On March 1, 2022, Anderson announced that he would retire as Head Coach at Pittsburg State effective the end of the season.

Head coaching record

References

External links
Pittsburg State profile
Missouri profile

1955 births
Living people
American expatriate basketball people in France
American expatriate basketball people in Italy
American men's basketball coaches
American men's basketball players
Basketball coaches from Missouri
Basketball players from Missouri
Baylor Bears men's basketball coaches
Central Missouri Mules basketball coaches
College men's basketball head coaches in the United States
FC Mulhouse Basket players
Fulgor Libertas Forlì players
Milwaukee Bucks draft picks
Missouri Tigers men's basketball coaches
Missouri Tigers men's basketball players
Pittsburg State Gorillas men's basketball coaches
Portland Trail Blazers draft picks
Portland Trail Blazers players
Small forwards
Sportspeople from Sedalia, Missouri